Soumaya Laamiri (born 8 September 1995) is a Tunisian footballer who plays as a midfielder for AS Banque de l'Habitat and the Tunisia women's national team.

Club career
Laamiri has played for AS Banque de l'Habitat in Tunisia.

International career
Laamiri capped for Tunisia at senior level during 2016 Africa Women Cup of Nations qualification.

International goals
Scores and results list Tunisia's goal tally first

Personal life
Laamiri is Muslim, wearing hijab even during her international football matches.

See also
List of Tunisia women's international footballers

References

External links

1995 births
Living people
Tunisian women's footballers
Women's association football midfielders
Tunisia women's international footballers
Tunisian Muslims